Salimicrobium album is a bacterium from the genus of Salimicrobium which has been isolated from a saltern from Alicante in Spain.

References

 

Bacillaceae
Bacteria described in 1985